Georg Burchard Jersin (20 January 1767 – 5 October 1827) was a Norwegian Lutheran minister who served as a representative at the Norwegian Constitutional Assembly.

Georg Burchard Jersin was born at Leikanger in Sogn og Fjordane, Norway. He was the son of the parish priest. He attended Bergen Cathedral School in 1786. He was enrolled at the  University of Copenhagen where he earned his cand. Theol. in 1793. He was assigned as an assistant parish priest at Voss in Hordaland from 1794. He replaced his father as parish priest in 1808.

He represented Søndre Bergenhus amt (now Hordaland) at the Norwegian Constituent Assembly at Eidsvoll in 1814. At the Assembly, Jersin voted with the independence party (Selvstendighetspartiet).

References

1767 births
1827 deaths
Norwegian Lutherans
People from Hordaland
People from Leikanger
Norwegian priest-politicians
Hordaland politicians
Fathers of the Constitution of Norway